Gordon Raymond Day (born 4 January 1936) is a retired South African sprinter. He competed at the 1960 Summer Olympics in the 400 metres and 4×400 metres relay events and finished fourth in the relay. He was part of the South African team that won the 4×440 yards relay at the 1958 British Empire and Commonwealth Games, while finishing third in the individual 220 yards.

References

1936 births
Living people
People from Richtersveld Local Municipality
White South African people
South African male sprinters
Olympic athletes of South Africa
Athletes (track and field) at the 1960 Summer Olympics
Commonwealth Games gold medallists for South Africa
Commonwealth Games bronze medallists for South Africa
Commonwealth Games medallists in athletics
Athletes (track and field) at the 1958 British Empire and Commonwealth Games
Medallists at the 1958 British Empire and Commonwealth Games